Laser Mission is a West German action film directed by Beau J. Davis. The film stars Brandon Lee, Ernest Borgnine and Werner Pochath. The film was released under the title Soldier of Fortune. This was Werner Pochath's final film appearance before his death on April 18, 1993.

Plot
The plot concerns a mercenary named Michael Gold (Lee) who is sent to convince Dr. Braun (Borgnine), a laser specialist, to defect to the United States before the KGB acquire him and use both his talent and a stolen diamond to create a nuclear weapon. Dr. Braun is captured by the KGB and Gold is sent on a mission to rescue both him and the diamond. He has to enlist the help of Dr. Braun's daughter Alissa (Debi A. Monahan), whom he eventually falls for. The pair confront Col. Kalishnakov (Graham Clarke), whom they kill by hitting him with a truck in the climax of this story.

Cast
Brandon Lee as Michael Gold
Debi A. Monahan as Alissa 
Ernest Borgnine as Prof. Braun
Graham Clark as Col. Kalishnakov
Trevor Williamson as The Foot

Release
In the United States the film was released on home video in 1990 by Turner Home Entertainment.

The film was released in Australia directly on video in 1994.

Box Office 
In the US the film was a financial success.

After Brandon Lee's untimely death in an accident on the set of The Crow, movies such as Laser Mission saw a surge in video sales.

Reception and legacy
From contemporary reviews, Variety described the film as a "lively, well-made actioner with humor" that had both Brandon Lee and Debi Monahan left to "struggle with a mediocre script." 
Jon Casimir of The Sydney Morning Herald did not like the film finding the acting poor, with the plot and action scenes unconvincing. Pat Gillespie of The Age found the direction clumsy but said that Lee's and action films fans would find the film entertaining.

From retrospective reviews, Jim Vorel and Kenneth Lowe of Paste Magazine did not like it and found the continuity disorienting. Dan Colón of Talk Film Society said the film is great for those with the appetite action orientated B movie.

RiffTrax spoofed the film on October 3, 2011.

References

Sources

External links
 
 
 
 Excerpts of RiffTrax's treatment on official YouTube channel
 Official video trailer

1989 films
1989 action films
German action films
West German films
Cold War spy films
English-language German films
Films about mercenaries
Films shot in Germany
Films shot in Namibia
Films shot in South Africa
1980s English-language films
1980s German films